Šiljak is a South-Slavic toponym and Bosnian/Serbian surname. The highest peak of Rtanj is Šiljak (1,565 m). Notable people with the surname include:

Dragoslav D. Šiljak
Slobodan Šiljak
Ermin Šiljak

See also
Šiljakovac, suburban settlement of Belgrade

Serbian surnames
Montenegrin surnames